Rasmus Windingstad (born 31 October 1993) is a Norwegian World Cup alpine ski racer.

At the Junior World Championships in 2014, he won a bronze medal in the giant slalom, was seventh in the super combined, and ninth in the slalom. Windingstad made his World Cup debut in February 2014 in St. Moritz, but did not finish the first run. Over the next year, he competed in five more World Cup races, but did not finish any of them. He gained his first World Cup podium at Kranjska Gora in March 2019.

Windingstad has competed at three World Championships, and placed thirteenth in the giant slalom and combined events in 2019.

He has a Swedish mother and Norwegian father (from Gol),
and represents the sports club Bærums SK.

World Cup results

Season standings

Race podiums
 1 win – (1 PG)
 3 podiums – (2 GS, 1 PG); 11 top tens

World Championship results

Olympic results

References

External links
 
 
 

1993 births
Living people
Norwegian people of Swedish descent
Sportspeople from Bærum
Norwegian male alpine skiers
Place of birth missing (living people)
Alpine skiers at the 2022 Winter Olympics
Olympic alpine skiers of Norway
Medalists at the 2022 Winter Olympics
Olympic medalists in alpine skiing
Olympic bronze medalists for Norway